UG, U.G., or Ug may refer to:

Organizations
 Unidade Galega, a Galician nationalist and social democratic political coalition
 Sevenair (IATA code), an airline based in Tunisia
 Universal Genève, a Swiss watch company

Universities
 University of Groningen, in Groningen, the Netherlands
 University of Galway, in Galway, Ireland
 University of Gdańsk, in Gdańsk, Poland
 University of Georgia, in Athens, Georgia, US
 University of Ghana, in Legon, Ghana
 University of Ghent, in Ghent, Belgium
 University of Graz, in Graz, Austria
 University of Greifswald, in Greifswald, Germany
 University of Guadalajara, in Guadalajara, Jalisco, Mexico
 University of Guanajuato, in Guanajuato, Mexico
 University of Guam, in Mangilao, Guam
 University of Guelph, in Guelph, Ontario, Canada
 University of Guyana, in Georgetown, Guyana

Language
 Universal grammar, a theory of linguistics postulating principles of grammar
 Uyghur language (ISO 639-1 language code)

Science and technology
 Gravitational potential energy, potential energy associated with gravitational force
 Utility graph, a mathematical graph used in the "water, gas, and electricity" problem
 Siemens NX, formerly known as NX Unigraphics or usually just UG, is an advanced high-end CAD/CAM/CAE software package
 User guide or user's guide, an instruction manual

Other uses
 Ug (book), a children's book by Raymond Briggs
 Ultimate Guitar Archive, a guitarist community website
 Entrepreneurial company (Germany), a German form of a private limited company
 U. G. Krishnamurti (1918–2007), a speaker and philosopher
 Uganda (ISO 3166-1 alpha-2 and top-level domain country code)

See also

 
 μg (mu-g), a metric unit for mass, denoting a microgram
 μG (mu-G), denoting microgravity
 MG (disambiguation), for some uses of μG/ΜG (Mu-G)
 Ugh (disambiguation)